Vennard College was a non-denominational Christian college located in University Park, Iowa, located just outside of Oskaloosa, Iowa. It was announced on Nov. 12, 2008 that the college would close at the end of the 2008 fall semester due to a decline in enrollment and financial difficulty.  The college held its final commencement on Nov. 22, 2008 and it is now closed.

History
In 1910, Dr. Iva Durham Vennard founded Chicago Evangelistic Institute (CEI) in Chicago, Illinois, for the purpose of providing "effective training for Christian service." Her stated goals were to send Spirit-filled people into the ministry and to promote Scriptural Holiness.

In 1951, the school moved to University Park, Iowa, where it was renamed Vennard College in 1959. The move to the beautiful, rural setting brought Vennard into a familial relationship with the graduates of the three other Christian colleges which formerly occupied the campus: Central Holiness University, John Fletcher College, and Kletzing College.

Dr. Vennard's presidency was followed by the leadership of Dr. Harry E. Jessop. Presidents of Vennard College have included Dr. H. M. Couchenour, Dr. J. Sutherland Logan, Dr. Merne A. Harris, Dr. Warthen T. Israel, Dr. Burnis Bushong (interim president) and Dr. Blake J. Neff.

In 1996, Vennard College was newly incorporated to continue the tradition of Christian higher education on this historic campus with Dr. W. Edward Rickman as president. In 2002, Dr. Bruce E. Moyer picked up the reins of leadership; but the College was unable to remain open.

Scandal erupted in 2007 with reports that the college knowingly housed a convicted sex offender on campus, less than 1000 feet from a day care center.

Vennard College announced on November 12, 2008 that it would close at the end of the 2008 fall semester, according to the Des Moines Register. The academic records have been transferred to the University of Iowa, and the transcripts can be obtained from the Registrar's Office of the University of Iowa.

Vennard College archives have been transferred to MidAmerican Nazarene University in Olathe, KS.

Athletics
Vennard's mascot was the Cougar and the official school colors were purple and white.

Vennard College offered intercollegiate sports in men and women’s basketball, women’s volleyball and men’s soccer. Vennard College was a member of NCCAA Division II and the Midwest Christian College Conference. All teams were eligible for conference and post season tournaments. Individual players were eligible for All Conference, All Region and All American Teams.

Recreation
Vennard College boasted many opportunities to participate in a variety of intramural sports that included dodge ball and indoor soccer.  The campus was home to a miniature golf course that was open to the public.
The miniature golf course is still in operation and open to the public.

Notable alumni

 Harold Sherk (1903-1974), Christian pacifist

References

Further reading
 Harris, Merne A.  The Torch Goeth Onward Still--  University Park, Iowa: Vennard College Alumni Association, 2000.

External links
 Vennard College Alumni Association

Defunct private universities and colleges in Iowa
2008 disestablishments in Iowa
Educational institutions disestablished in 2008